= Asociación Balear de Amigos de las Bandas Sonoras =

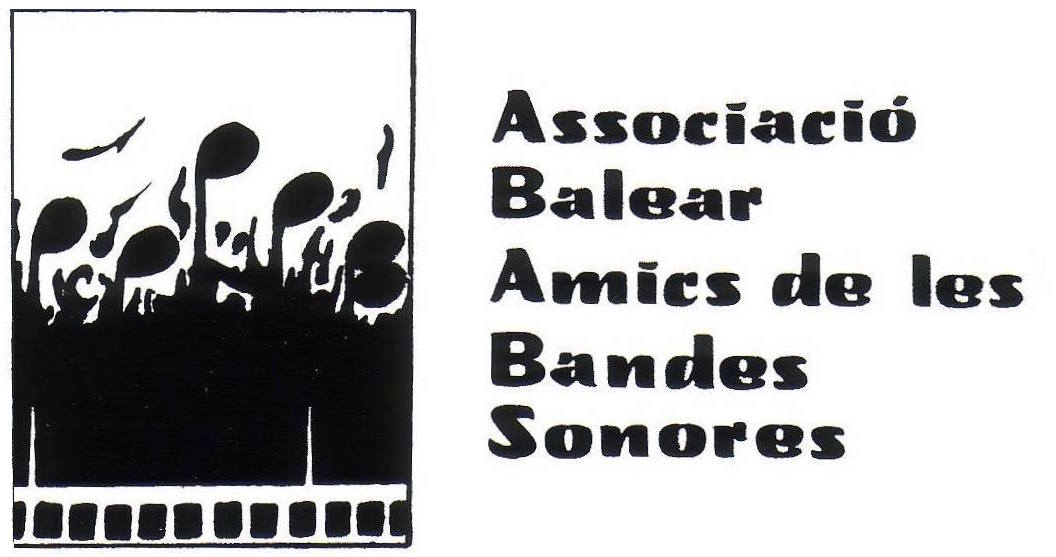
- Abbreviation: ABABS
- Formation: 1989
- Type: Soundtrack film organization
- Purpose: Promotion and development of soundtrack films
- Location: Palma, Spain
- Region served: Balearic Islands
- Official language: Spanish, Catalan
- President: Joan Arbona Comellas

The Asociación Balear de Amigos de las Bandas Sonoras (ABABS) is an association dedicated to the divulgation of collecting, studying and divulgation film soundtracks founded in Palma (Balearic Islands, Spain) in 1989.

Since the foundation, has promoted all kinds of activities related to divulgation of cinematographic musical culture, mainly in the Balearic Islands, with the aim of placing it at the same level as other musical genres with more tradition and historical background. The association carries out a very transversal activity. Among its activities, it has organized film screenings, exhibitions, conferences, talks and other events of an informative nature, often combined with concerts or concert cycles, both by film music composers and monographs by specific composers.

It has collaborated with leading musical groups in the Balearic Islands, such as the Municipal Music Band of Palma (currently Simfovents) and the Balearic Symphony Orchestra. It has also participated in activities of groups specialized in the interpretation of music for the international cinema, such as the Chamber Film Orchestra amb the Film Symphony Orchestra. In addition to participating in activities related in general, in one way or another, with film music.
